The Remington Model 504 is a bolt-action rimfire rifle that can chamber .22 LR, .17 HM2 or .17 HMR cartridges. The gun is a replacement of the now obsolete Remington Model 541, and was itself replaced by the Remington Model 547 in 2007.  The Model 504T was a target variant built in 2006 that differed from the original 504 in using a laminated wood stock with a raised comb, a target style forearm and a heavier barrel.

References

Bolt-action rifles of the United States
Remington Arms firearms
.22 LR rifles